CIM or Cim may refer to:

Businesses and organizations

Professional organizations 
 Canadian Institute of Mining, Metallurgy and Petroleum, a professional organisation
 The Chartered Institute of Marketing, a professional organisation

Religious organizations 
 China Inland Mission, a missionary society
 Congregation of Jesus and Mary (Congregatio Iesu et Mariae), a Society of Apostolic Life in the Roman Catholic Church

Schools 
 Cebu Institute of Medicine, a medical school in Cebu City, Philippines
 Cleveland Institute of Music, a school in Cleveland, Ohio
 Cyprus Institute of Marketing

Transportation 
 Chicago and Illinois Midland Railway
 Cimber Air, ICAO code
 Uniform Rules Concerning the Contract of International Carriage of Goods by Rail, known as CIM, adopted by the Intergovernmental Organisation for International Carriage by Rail

Other organizations 
 California Institution for Men, a state prison in the United States
 Comcast Interactive Media, a division of Comcast
 Inter-American Commission of Women, an international diplomatic organization
 Central Institute of Metrology of North Korea

Places
 Cim, Mostar in Bosnia and Herzegovina
 Cim (archaeological site) in Bosnia and Herzegovina
 Cim, Caernarfonshire, the name of two areas near Pen-y-groes, Caernarfonshire, Wales, meaning "common land" or "shared ground"

Science and technology 
 Common Information Model (computing), a standard for representing elements in an IT environment
 Common Information Model (electricity), a standard for the exchange of information about an electrical network
 Computer Integrated Manufacturing, the use of computers to control production process
 Critical illness myopathy, a syndrome of diffuse muscle weakness in critically ill patients
 Customer interaction management, software for managing interactions with customers

Other uses 
 California International Marathon, a road race
 Certificate of Initial Mastery, an outcome-based education diploma
 Chartered Investment Manager, a designation of the Canadian Securities Institute
 Cities in Motion, a business simulation video game
 Confidential Information Memorandum, a marketing tool for the sale of business shares or assets